Niall Thomas Cowperthwaite (born 28 January 1992) is an English professional footballer who plays for Lancaster City as a left back.

Career
Born in Barrow-in-Furness, Cowperthwaite moved from the Morecambe juniors to the senior team in August 2010. In May 2012, Cowperthwaite was released by the club. He spent the 2012–13 season with Workington. In June 2013 he left Workington to attend Lancaster University. Later that month he signed for Kendal Town. He also played for Penrith.

In December 2013, he signed for Barrow on non-contract terms. In February 2016 he ruptured his ACL. In July 2018, after two years without a club, he returned to Workington.

On 21 May 2019, he joined Lancaster City.

Personal life
He is the son of former Barrow striker Colin Cowperthwaite.

Career statistics

References

1992 births
Living people
English footballers
Morecambe F.C. players
Workington A.F.C. players
Kendal Town F.C. players
Penrith F.C. players
Barrow A.F.C. players
Lancaster City F.C. players
English Football League players
Footballers from Barrow-in-Furness
Association football fullbacks
Footballers from Cumbria
National League (English football) players